Sta. Teresa College (formerly St. Theresa's Academy and Colegio de Santa Teresa de Jesus) often abbreviated as "STC" is a Catholic education institution founded in 1920 and established by the Franciscan Sisters in 1940. Its main campus is located at Kapitan Ponso Street, Bauan, Batangas, Philippines. To date, STC is one of the oldest Catholic Schools within the jurisdiction of the Archdiocese of Lipa.

History
Originally, classes were held in nipa huts run by the Sisters of the Good Shepherd (RGS) nuns in the 1940s. Because of World War II, STA was forced to close as it was too dangerous to hold classes. When it re-opened after the Philippine Liberation, the RGS nuns turned over the school to the Archdiocese of Lipa. 

In the 1970s, the school then named St. Theresa's Academy started to gain acclaim in the field of education under the guidance of Monsignor Alberto Boongaling. His work was continued by Reverend Father Conrado G. Castillo, who served as the director from 1984 to 1994 and as the first college president from 1994 to 2004. After his term, Reverend Father Carlo Magno C. Ilagan took over the presidency, and from 2004 to 2015, he instigated numerous reforms and school development programs that included, among other things, the opening of a tertiary school and the building of classrooms and offices.

Facilities
The school uses a RFID Attendance Monitoring System to ensure the security of its students. The school also have a Learning Management System wherein the student use iPad or tablets to store copies of their textbooks in the form of e-books. Quizzes and surveys are completed using tablets which do not require paper and pen. 

The school has classrooms equipped with air-conditioning and its laboratories are up-to-date with learning and teaching tools. 

Grade School Department

The Grade School Department is a two-floor building.

High School Department

The High School Department is composed of four buildings.

College Department

The College Department is a four-floor building.

Canteen

The Main School Canteen serves the Grade School, High School, and College Departments. The Preparatory Department has its own cafeteria.

STC Gymnasium

STC has 2 gymnasiums, dedicated to San Lorenzo Ruiz and San Pedro Calungsod. The gymnasiums are primarily used for provincial, city or school competitions, sports and entertainment. Different programs are also held here like intramural sports, Family Day, etc.

Function Hall

STC has 3 function halls. The largest hall is used for large groups of students or major functions, another is located beside the school chapel and a third hall is located near Gate 3 of the Grade School Department.

Publications
The college's publication is The Leaf, and it has three editions, namely, Kiddie, Campus and College Editions.

Officials
In 2015, there was a significant change in the set of officials of the school's administration. Due to the reshuffling of priests in Batangas, Fr. Carlo Ilagan left his position as the school's president for his new assignment as the parish priest of Invencion de la Sta. Cruz Parish in Alitagtag, Batangas. Apparently, Fr. Ricardo Panganiban was appointed as the Unified Schools of the Archdiocese of Lipa and STC's new president. Dr. Randy M. Baja was appointed as the College Dean and Vice President for Academics, while Fr. Mike Samaniego was named as vice president for Finance and Administrative Services. USAL schools are required to have only one principal and one Chief Operating Officer (COO). For Sta. Teresa College, Mr. Aurelio Manalo Jr. was appointed as COO and Mrs. Violeta Ramos was appointed as the principal of the school, respectively.

In 2019, Fr. Carlo Ilagan returned as the President for STC. On his return, the school had a ceremony at the San Lorenzo Ruiz Hall.

Rev. Fr. Carlo Magno Ilagan - President
Rev. Fr. Mike Samaniego - Finance
Mr. Aurelio Manalo Jr. - Chief Operating Officer
Dr. Randy Baja - College Dean
Dr. Violeta Ramos - Basic Education Department Principal

References 

Schools in Batangas
Educational institutions established in 1940
Universities and colleges in Batangas
Catholic universities and colleges in the Philippines
Catholic secondary schools in the Philippines
Catholic elementary schools in the Philippines
1940 establishments in the Philippines